Fun? is the second album from the British rock band the Candyskins.  It contains their hit single "Wembley".  It is the band's last release on a major label, being dropped by Geffen following two years of inactivity after its release.  The disagreement with the label led to the arrest of Nick and Mark Cope, the band's lead singer and rhythm guitarist, for spray painting 'No Fun' on the wall of their former employer.

Reception

Dave Thompson wrote in his book Alternative Rock that the band with this release "emphasize the rock'n'pop with bigger sound, riddled with soaring leads, rougher riffs, [and] some genuinely meaty power chords".  Tom Demalon of AllMusic says the "lyrics, mainly dealing with failed relationships, contrast the sweetness and lightweight feel of the music" and that the tracks highlight "the band's musical diversity".  John M. Borack writes in Shake Some Action that album is "[h]ugely entertaining and vastly underrated".

Music videos
The video for "Wembley" shows the plight of a hitchhiker wearing nothing but platform shoes and briefs.

Track listing

Personnel
Nick Cope – vocals
Mark Cope – guitar
Nick Burton – lead guitar
Karl Shale – bass
John Halliday - drums

Charts
Billboard singles charts

References

The Candyskins albums
1993 albums
Geffen Records albums